Monarch Beverage may refer to:

 Monarch Beverage Company of Atlanta, Georgia
 Monarch Beverage, Inc. of Indianapolis, Indiana